The Pyramid Glacier is actually a scattering of glaciers and snowfields located on the south-southwestern flank of Mount Rainier in Washington. The Success Divide separates this glacier from the South Tahoma Glacier to the west. Both the Success Glacier and lower end of the Kautz Glacier border this glacier on the eastern side. Meltwater from the glacier drains into the Nisqually River.

See also
List of glaciers

References

Glaciers of Mount Rainier
Glaciers of Washington (state)